{{Speciesbox
| status = VU
| status_system = IUCN3.1
| taxon = Labeobarbus acutirostris
| display_parents = 3
| authority = (Bini, 1940) 
| synonyms = *Barbus acutirostris Bini, 1940 
}}Labeobarbus acutirostris is a species of ray-finned fish in the genus Labeobarbus'' which is endemic to Lake Tana in Ethiopia.

References 

acutirostris
Fish described in 1940
Fish of Lake Tana
Endemic fauna of Ethiopia